Rachidion is a genus of beetles in the family Cerambycidae, containing the following species:

 Rachidion gagatinum (Germar, 1824)
 Rachidion nigritum Audinet-Serville, 1834
 Rachidion obesum Newman, 1840
 Rachidion ramulicorne Lacordaire, 1869

References

Trachyderini
Cerambycidae genera